Aleksandr Nikolayevich Lebedev (born 1 April 1981) is a former Russian professional footballer.

Club career
He made his professional debut in the Russian Premier League in 1999 for PFC CSKA Moscow.

Honours
 Russian Premier League bronze: 1999.

References

1981 births
Living people
Russian footballers
PFC CSKA Moscow players
Russian Premier League players
Association football midfielders
FC Sever Murmansk players